Whitton is a civil parish in Shropshire, England.  It contains three listed buildings that are recorded in the National Heritage List for England.  Of these, one is listed at Grade I, the highest of the three grades, one is at Grade II*, the middle grade, and the other is at Grade II, the lowest grade.  The parish contains the village of Whitton and the surrounding area, and the listed buildings consist of a church, a churchyard cross, and a former manor house.


Key

Buildings

References

Citations

Sources

Lists of buildings and structures in Shropshire